Ted Niceley is an American record producer. He is most known for his production work with Fugazi, Girls Against Boys, Jawbox, Tripping Daisy, and others.

Production credits
Select production/engineering/mixing credits include the following:

 Tommy Keene – Strange Alliance (1981) ◦‣
 Tommy Keene – Places That Are Gone (1984) ◦‣
 Fugazi – 13 Songs (1989)
 Fugazi – Repeater (1990)
 The Dead Milkmen – Soul Rotation (1992)
 Noir Désir – Tostaky (1992)
 Noir Désir – Dies Irae (1993)
 Girls Against Boys – Venus Luxure No.1 Baby (1993)
 Fugazi – In on the Kill Taker (1993)
 Magnapop – Kiss My Mouth (1993)
 Shudder to Think – Hit Liquor (1994)
 Girls Against Boys – Cruise Yourself (1994)
 Jawbox – For Your Own Special Sweetheart (1994)
 Shudder to Think – Pony Express Record (1994)
 Stanford Prison Experiment – The Gato Hunch (1995)
 Tripping Daisy – I Am an Elastic Firecracker (1995)
 Ruth Ruth – Laughing Gallery (1995)
 Noir Désir –666.667 Club (1996)
 Frente – Shape (1996)
 Girls Against Boys – House of GVSB (1996)
Doughboys – Turn Me On (tracks: 2, 4, 5, 8, 10 to 12) (1996)
 Shudder to Think – 50,000 B.C. (1997)
 Stanford Prison Experiment – Wrecreation (1998)
 Girls Against Boys – You Can't Fight What You Can't See (2002)
 Future Kings of Spain – Future Kings of Spain (2002)
 Gâtechien  – 4 (2010)
 The Hyènes  –            Peace & Loud (2012)
 Backbone Party – Beirutopia  (2013)
 New Rising Sons –Set It Right (2019) ◦‣

 ◦‣ Denotes bass performance credit

Compilation Albums and Singles
 Clerks: Music from the Motion Picture : Track: Kill the Sexplayer – Artist: Girls Against Boys (1994)
 Mallrats : Track: Cruise Your New Baby Fly Self – Artist: Girls Against Boys (1995)
 Higher Learning (Soundtrack) : Track: Eye – Artist: Eve's Plum (1995)

References

American audio engineers
American record producers
Living people
Place of birth missing (living people)
Year of birth missing (living people)